NCAA Division III independent schools are four-year institutions that compete in college athletics at the NCAA Division III level, but do not belong to an established athletic conference for a particular sport. These schools may however still compete as members of an athletic conference in other sports. A school may also be fully independent, and not belong to any athletic conference for any sport at all. The reason for independent status varies among institutions, but it is frequently because the school's primary athletic conference does not sponsor a particular sport.

Full independents
Departing members are highlighted in pink.

Current members

Notes

Former members

Notes

Football
Departing members are highlighted in pink.

Potential future independent 
Lyon College started a transition from NAIA in 2022–23, and will join the D-III St. Louis Intercollegiate Athletic Conference in 2023 — which does not sponsor football. Lyon already announced that will join the Southern Collegiate Athletic Conference as a football-only affiliate starting in the 2024 season. Consequently, Lyon will probably be a football independent in the 2023 season.

Field hockey

† - Women's college, therefore not competing in men's sports.

Golf

Men

Women

† - Women's college, therefore not competing in men's sports.

Potential future independent 
Hartford started a transition from NCAA Division I in 2021–22, and will join the D-III Commonwealth Coast Conference—which sponsors golf only for men—in July 2023.

Ice hockey

Men

Women

Lacrosse

Men

Rowing

Swimming & diving

Men

Women

† - Women's college, therefore not competing in men's sports.

Notes

Tennis

Men

Track & field (indoor)

Men

Women

Track & field (outdoor)

Men

Notes

Volleyball (indoor)

Men

Wrestling

Emerging sports for women

Acrobatics & tumbling

Rugby

Triathlon

See also
 NCAA Division I independent schools
 NCAA Division II independent schools
 NAIA independent schools

 
Independents
Division III